Alison Mary Gray  (11 March 1943 – 1 September 2021) was a New Zealand writer and social researcher. She wrote 11 books, ranging from feminist oral histories to novels and children's books. Gray established a social policy research consultancy that contributed to public sector policy reports in New Zealand and other Pacific nations.

In 1990, Gray received the New Zealand 1990 Commemoration Medal. In the 2003 Queen's Birthday Honours, she was awarded the Queen's Service Medal for public services.

Gray died in Wellington from motor neuron disease on 1 September 2021.

Selected works

References

1943 births
2021 deaths
People educated at Chilton Saint James School
People educated at Wellington Girls' College
Victoria University of Wellington alumni
University of Auckland alumni
New Zealand writers
New Zealand women writers
Recipients of the Queen's Service Medal
Deaths from motor neuron disease